Teinostomops singularis is a species of submarine cave snail, a marine gastropod mollusk in the family Neritiliidae.

Description

Distribution

References

External links
  Kano, Y.; Kase, T. (2008). Diversity and distributions of the submarine-cave Neritiliidae in the Indo-Pacific (Gastropoda: Neritimorpha). Organisms, Diversity & Evolution. 8: 22-43

Neritiliidae
Gastropods described in 2008